The 1970 Oklahoma Sooners football team represented the University of Oklahoma in the 1970 NCAA University Division football season, the 76th season of Sooner football. The team was led by head coach Chuck Fairbanks in his fourth season as the OU head coach. They played their home games at Gaylord Family Oklahoma Memorial Stadium in Norman, Oklahoma. They were a member of the Big Eight Conference.

Conference play began at Folsom Field in Boulder, Colorado on October 17, with a win over the Colorado Buffaloes, and ended on November 28 at home in Norman with a win over Oklahoma State in the annual Bedlam Series. The Sooners lost their second conference game to Kansas State; the Wildcats' next victory in the series did not occur until 1993.

Following a loss in their third game to Oregon State, the Sooners installed the wishbone offense during the open week prior to the Red River Shootout against Texas. The Sooners ran the wishbone continuously, save for a switch to the I formation in 1982 and 1983, until the early 1990s.

After finishing the regular season with a record of 7–4 (5–2 in Big 8 play), the Sooners were invited to play in the Astro-Bluebonnet Bowl, where they tied the Alabama Crimson Tide, 24–24.

Following the season, John Watson was selected in the seventh round of the 1971 NFL Draft, and Steve Casteel was chosen in the 10th.

Schedule

Roster

Rankings

Postseason

NFL draft
The following players were drafted into the National Football League following the season.

References

Oklahoma
Oklahoma Sooners football seasons
Oklahoma Sooners football